Fair Hill is an unincorporated community in Cecil County, Maryland, United States. Fair Hill is located at the intersection of Maryland routes 213 and 273, north of Elkton. It is home to the Fair Hill Natural Resources Management Area, a 5,613 acre protected area formerly part of the land holdings of William duPont, Jr.

References

External links

Cecil County

Unincorporated communities in Cecil County, Maryland
Unincorporated communities in Maryland